The Thirteen Buddhist Sites of Dewa（出羽の国十三仏霊場, Dewa no kuni jūsan butsu reijō）are a group of 13 Buddhist sacred sites in Yamagata Prefecture, Japan. The temples are dedicated to the Thirteen Buddhas.

Directory

See also
 Thirteen Buddhas

External links
 Japanese language listing

Buddhist temples in Yamagata Prefecture
Buddhist pilgrimage sites in Japan